What Jail Is Like is an EP by the band The Afghan Whigs.

Track listing
 "What Jail Is Like"
 "Mr. Superlove"
 "Dark End Of The Street"
 "Little Girl Blue"
 "What Jail Is Like" (Live)
 "Now You Know" (Live)
 "My World Is Empty Without You/I Hear A Symphony" (Live)

References

External links
EP track listing on the Summer's Kiss website

1994 EPs
The Afghan Whigs albums
Elektra Records EPs